This is a list of bestselling novels in the United States in the 1990s, as determined by Publishers Weekly. The list features the most popular novels of each year from 1990 through 1999.

The standards set for inclusion in the lists – which, for example, led to the exclusion of the novels in the Harry Potter series from the lists for the 1990s and 2000s – are currently unknown.

1990
 The Plains of Passage by Jean M. Auel
 Four Past Midnight by Stephen King
 The Burden of Proof by Scott Turow
 Memories of Midnight by Sidney Sheldon
 Message from Nam by Danielle Steel
 The Bourne Ultimatum by Robert Ludlum
 The Stand by Stephen King
 Lady Boss by Jackie Collins
 The Witching Hour by Anne Rice
 September by Rosamunde Pilcher

1991
 Scarlett by Alexandra Ripley
 The Sum of All Fears by Tom Clancy
 Needful Things by Stephen King
 No Greater Love by Danielle Steel
 Heartbeat by Danielle Steel
 The Doomsday Conspiracy by Sidney Sheldon
 The Firm by John Grisham
 Night Over Water by Ken Follett
 Remember by Barbara Taylor Bradford
 Loves Music, Loves to Dance by Mary Higgins Clark

1992
 Dolores Claiborne by Stephen King
 The Pelican Brief by John Grisham
 Gerald's Game by Stephen King
 Mixed Blessings by Danielle Steel
 Jewels by Danielle Steel
 The Stars Shine Down by Sidney Sheldon
 The Tale of the Body Thief by Anne Rice
 Mexico by James A. Michener
 Waiting to Exhale by Terry McMillan
 All Around the Town by Mary Higgins Clark

1993
 The Bridges of Madison County by Robert James Waller
 The Client by John Grisham
 Slow Waltz in Cedar Bend by Robert James Waller
 Without Remorse by Tom Clancy
 Nightmares & Dreamscapes by Stephen King
 Vanished by Danielle Steel
 Lasher by Anne Rice
 Pleading Guilty by Scott Turow
 Like Water for Chocolate by Laura Esquivel
 The Scorpio Illusion by Robert Ludlum

1994
 The Chamber by John Grisham
 Debt of Honor by Tom Clancy
 The Celestine Prophecy by James Redfield
 The Gift by Danielle Steel
 Insomnia by Stephen King
 Politically Correct Bedtime Stories by James Finn Garner
 Wings by Danielle Steel
 Accident by Danielle Steel
 The Bridges of Madison County by Robert James Waller
 Disclosure by Michael Crichton

1995
 The Rainmaker by John Grisham
 The Lost World by Michael Crichton
 Five Days in Paris by Danielle Steel
 The Christmas Box by Richard Paul Evans
 Lightning by Danielle Steel
 The Celestine Prophecy by James Redfield
 Rose Madder by Stephen King
 Silent Night by Mary Higgins Clark
 Politically Correct Holiday Stories by James Finn Garner
 The Horse Whisperer by Nicholas Evans

1996
 The Runaway Jury by John Grisham
 Executive Orders by Tom Clancy
 Desperation by Stephen King
 Airframe by Michael Crichton
 The Regulators by Richard Bachman (Stephen King)
 Malice by Danielle Steel
 Silent Honor by Danielle Steel
 Primary Colors by Anonymous
 Cause of Death by Patricia Cornwell
 The Tenth Insight by James Redfield

1997
 The Partner by John Grisham
 Cold Mountain by Charles Frazier
 The Ghost by Danielle Steel
 The Ranch by Danielle Steel
 Special Delivery by Danielle Steel
 Unnatural Exposure by Patricia Cornwell
 The Best Laid Plans by Sidney Sheldon
 Pretend You Don't See Her by Mary Higgins Clark
 Cat and Mouse by James Patterson
 Hornet's Nest by Patricia Cornwell

1998
 The Street Lawyer by John Grisham
 Rainbow Six by Tom Clancy
 Bag of Bones by Stephen King
 A Man in Full by Tom Wolfe
 Mirror Image by Danielle Steel
 The Long Road Home by Danielle Steel
 The Klone and I by Danielle Steel
 Point of Origin by Patricia Cornwell
 Paradise by Toni Morrison
 All Through the Night by Mary Higgins Clark

1999
 The Testament by John Grisham
 Hannibal by Thomas Harris
 Assassins by Jerry B. Jenkins and Tim LaHaye
 Star Wars: Episode 1, The Phantom Menace by Terry Brooks
 Timeline by Michael Crichton
 Hearts in Atlantis by Stephen King
 Apollyon by Jerry B. Jenkins and Tim LaHaye
 The Girl Who Loved Tom Gordon by Stephen King
 Irresistible Forces by Danielle Steel
 Tara Road by Maeve Binchy

1990s in the United States
1990s books
Publishers Weekly bestselling novels series